AKA is a 2002 drama film, the first by director and writer Duncan Roy. The film is set in the late 1970s in Britain and deals with the story of Dean, an 18-year-old boy who assumes another identity in order to enter high society. Dean then meets David, an older gay man who desires him and Benjamin, a young Texan hustler. It is largely an autobiographical account of Duncan Roy's early life.

The screen consists of a row of three frames, showing three perspectives.

Cast
 Matthew Leitch as Dean Page
 Diana Quick as Lady Gryffoyn
 George Asprey as David Lord Glendening 
 Lindsey Coulson as Georgie
 Blake Ritson as Alexander Gryffoyn
 Peter Youngblood Hills as Benjamin
 Geoff Bell as Brian Page
 Hannah Yelland as Camille Sturton
 Daniel Lee as Jamie Page
 Bill Nighy as Uncle Louis Gryffoyn
 David Kendall as Lee Page
 Fenella Woolgar as Sarah
 Sean Gilder as Tim Lyttleton
 Robin Soans as Neil Frost
 Stephen Boxer as Dermot

Reception
The film has been nominated for several awards, especially in the gay community.
 2002 — Nominated for the British Independent Film Awards.
 2002 — Won the Seattle Lesbian & Gay Film Festival.
 2002 — Won the Miami Gay and Lesbian Film Festival.
 2002 — Won L.A. Outfest.
 2002 — Won the Copenhagen Gay & Lesbian Film Festival.
 2003 — Nominated for the BAFTA Awards.
 2003 — Nominated for the Emden International Film Festival.
 2004 — Won the Los Angeles Film Critics Association Awards.

References

External links
 
 

2002 films
British LGBT-related films
2000s English-language films
2002 drama films
British drama films
2002 LGBT-related films
LGBT-related drama films
Gay-related films
2000s British films